Shahdagh Mountain Resort is Azerbaijan's first and largest winter resort.

Resort

The Shahdag Mountain Resort Complex (Şahdağ Turizm Merkezi) opened to the public in 2012. It is located in the Azerbaijan's Greater Caucasus range, the site is located near Shahdag National Park, which is known for having an intact ecological system and an untouched flora and fauna.

It is the first and largest ski resort in Azerbaijan. Plans for the project include 10-12 3 star hotels, golf-clubs, 160-180 cottages, Aqua Park and other objects (places for the living of employees, car parks, workshops for technical works etc.) in the complex.

Technical specifications

The winter season in Shahdagh begins in the second half of December and finishes at the beginning of April, depending on snow conditions.
In the website of Shahdagh the opening information is constantly updated for every season.

Main Developer
Ministry of Culture and Tourism (Azerbaijan) / The Administration of Shahdagh Mountain Resort

Operator
PGI Management

Elevation difference
1,435-2,525m

Passenger capacity
11,400 skiers/hour

Skiable area
 128Ha
 16,8 km skiable

Lifts
12 Lifts
 1 8-person Gondola
 3 4-seats detachable grips chairlift Chair Lift
 1 4-seats fixed grips chairlift 
 2 Platter Lift
 5 Magic Carpets

Slopes
14 Slopes:
 5 green
 5 blue
 4 red

Produced snow
 160 snow guns guaranteeing 100% of the resort's skiable area

Free style
2 Free style areas / snow parks

Ski School
There are 3 Ski and Mountain School with national and international instructors
 Lift Base 
 Shahdagh Hotel & Spa
 Pik Palace

Kids Club
Kindergarten / Kids Club
 Lift Base/ Zirve Hotel
 Shahdagh Hotel & Spa

Rescue and medical service
There is a rescue service in all of the slopes and a Medical Centre at Lift Base

Winter activities
There are Winter Activities Area at Lift Base including Segway, Snowmobile, snowshoeing, quads for kids, etc.

Shop and Rentals
 Lift Base 
 Shahdagh Hotel & Spa
 Pik Palace
 Main Square

Hotels
Currently there are 5 Hotels opened. Current hotel beds in Shahdagh Mountain Resort:
 Shahdag Hotel & Spa (346 beds)
 Zirve Hotel (86 beds)
 Gaya Residence (62 beds)
 Pik Palace (334 beds)
 Park Chalet (328 beds)
1,156 beds in total

Restaurants
20 Restaurants, caffés and bars:
 At Lift Base: Tez Bazar, Illy Café, Hot Dog Stand, Pizza Shop
 Zirve Hotel: Lezzet, Rahat Bar, Nefes Barbeque
 Shahdagh Hotel & Spa: Miras Restaurant, Khazine Bar, Menzere Bar & Restaurant, Ovdan Spa Bar and Ice Bar
 Gaya Residences: Alov Restaurant, Kulekli Barbeque
 Pik Palace: Fujisan Asian Restaurant & Bar, Alpina Brasserie and Wine Bar, Chocolat
 Park Chalet: Aspen Grill, Lounge and Bar, and Mocca Cafe

SPA and Wellness
4 SPA, Wellness and Fitness Centres:
 Gaya Residences: Fitness Centre
 Shahdagh Hotel & Spa: Ovdan & Fitness Centre (3.000 m^2)
 Pik Palace: SPA, The Club Fitness Centre (1.700 m^2)
 Park Chalet: SPA, The Club Fitness Centre (543 m^2)

Conference Centres
There are 3 Conference Centres located in:
 Shahdagh Hotel & Spa
 Zirve Hotel
 Pik Palace

Parking
There are 7 Car Parks: 
 Outside parking – At Lift Base
 At Lift Base
 Shahdagh Hotel & Spa
 Shahdagh Main Hotels Square
 Pik Palace
 Park Chalet
 Gondola Parking

Shahdagh in the Summer

Shahdagh Mountain Resort offers a wide range of activities to suit all ages during the summer, from an Adventure Park, to inflatable castles and quads bikes to Nordic walking and even Orienteering.

List of summer activities
 Chair Lifts
 Mountain Segway
 Bob Karts
 Trotinettes
 Zip Lines
 Paint Ball
 Mountain Bike
 Children Quad
 Adventure Park
 Horse Ride
 Inflatable Castle
 Nordic Walking & Trekkings
 Mountain Challenge

See also
Mount Shahdagh
Shahdagh National Park
Ministry of Culture and Tourism (Azerbaijan)
Azerbaijan

References

External links

 Official Site
  Ministry of Culture and Tourism of Azerbaijan Republic
 Operator Site 

Ski areas and resorts in Azerbaijan
Populated places in Qusar District